€2 commemorative coins are special euro coins minted and issued by member states of the eurozone since 2004 as legal tender in all eurozone member states. Only the national obverse sides of the coins differ; the common reverse sides do not. The coins typically commemorate the anniversaries of historical events or draw attention to current events of special importance – there have been common commemorative coins with only different national inscriptions at five occasions.

Since 2012, the number of commemorative coins is limited to two per country per year, previously only one was allowed. Additionally, issues of common commemoratives or a vacant head of state does not count towards the limit. The total number of commemorative coins put into circulation per year is also limited. The commemorative coins must respect the design standards stipulated for the common €2 coins, with limitations on the designs to guarantee uniformity, however designs have broken this rule such as the French entry in the 2008 coinage

Up to the end of 2022, four hundred and seventy-seven variations of €2 commemorative coins have been issued. Finland, Italy, Luxembourg, San Marino and the Vatican City are the only countries to have released at least one commemorative coin every year since 2004.

The €2 commemorative coins have become collectibles, but are different from commemorative coins with a face value different from €2, which are officially designated as "collector coins", not intended for circulation and usually made of precious metals.

Regulations and restrictions 
Commemorative coins shall bear a different national design from that of the regular coins and shall only commemorate subjects of major national or European relevance. Commemorative coins issued collectively by all Member States whose currency is the euro shall only commemorate subjects of the highest European relevance and their design shall be without prejudice to the possible constitutional requirements of these Member States. The 2-euro coin constitutes the most suitable denomination for this purpose, principally on account of the large diameter of the coin and its technical characteristics, which offer adequate protection against counterfeiting.

The basis for the euro coins is derived from a European recommendation from 2003, which allowed changing the national obverse sides of euro coins from 1 January 2004 onwards.

Regarding them, a series of restrictions apply:

 Commemorative coins have a different national face than usual and keep the common face.
 They are intended to commemorate some relevant event or personality at a national or European level.
 Each State can only issue one commemorative coin per year and always in the format of 2 euros. Since 2013 two commemorative coins per year are allowed.
 The joint commemorative issues carried out by all the States of the eurozone (that is to say, excluding the euro-issuing States that do not belong to the EU), are additional to the emissions carried out by each State individually.
 In the event that the State Headquarters is vacant or provisionally occupied, that State may issue an additional commemorative coin.
 The legend engraved on the edge of the commemorative euro coins intended for circulation must be the same as that on the normal euro coins intended for circulation.
 They have limited the maximum volume of emission.

The total number of such coins put into circulation per year should not surpass the higher of the following two numbers:

 0.1% of the total number of €2 coins put into circulation by all members of the eurozone. This limit can exceptionally be increased to up to 2.0 per cent if the coin commemorates a very important and noteworthy event; in this case, the member state issuing this higher number of coins should refrain from putting any commemorative coins into circulation for the following four years.
 5.0% of the total number of €2 coins put into circulation by the member state issuing the €2 commemorative coin.

Since 2005, the recommendations for the design of the national sides of all the coins have been modified, which has also affected the designs of the €2 commemorative coins of the following years. See Euro coins for more information.

Member states must inform each other of new draft designs, ultimately European Council and the European Commission approves them. In 2015, Belgium planned to submit a design commemorating the 200th anniversary of the Battle of Waterloo, which caused complaints from France. Belgium resigned from issuing such a coin. However, a Belgian collector's coin of 2.50 euros was issued, taking advantage of the fact that these coins are not submitted to approval process of draft designs.

Issues 
19 members of the Eurozone including four microstates have independently issued €2 commemorative coins with Greece being the first country to issue this type of coin. Croatia has yet to issue a commemorative coin since its Euro adoption.

There have been five common €2 commemorative coins issues:
 : 50 years since the Treaty of Rome in 2007.
 : 10 years of the Economic and Monetary Union of the European Union in 2009.
 : 10 years of Euro Coins and Banknotes in 2012.
 : 30 years of the Flag of Europe in 2015.
 : 35 years of the Erasmus Programme in 2022.

Three joint issues:
 : 50th anniversary of the signing of the Élysée Treaty (2013) – two coins, 30 years since the fall of the Berlin Wall (2019) – two coins.
  : The 100th anniversary of the foundation of the independent Baltic states (2018) – three coins.

Five coins series with a specific theme:
: 2024 Summer Olympics (2021–2024) – one coin per year representing sports at the 2024 Summer Olympics.
: Bundesländer I (2006–2022), Bundesländer  II (2023–2038) – one coin per year for each of the 16 States of the Federal Republic of Germany.
: Latvian Historical Regions (2016–2018) – four coins representing the Historical Latvian Lands.
: Spanish UNESCO World Heritage Sites (2010–future) – one coin per year commemorating Spain's UNESCO World Heritage Sites.

Issued designs are made public in the Official Journal of the European Union.

2004 coinage

2005 coinage

2006 coinage

2007 coinage

2007 commonly issued coin

2008 coinage

2009 coinage

2009 commonly issued coin

2010 coinage

2011 coinage

2012 coinage

2012 commonly issued coin

2013 coinage

2014 coinage

2015 coinage

2015 commonly issued coin

2016 coinage

2017 coinage

2018 coinage

2019 coinage

2020 coinage

2021 coinage

2022 coinage

2022 commonly issued coin

2023 coinage

2024 coinage

2025 coinage

References

External links 

 
 
 
 
 

Euro commemorative coins
Two-base-unit coins